Andrea Gaudenzi was the defending champion, but did not participate this year.

Alberto Martín won the title, defeating Fernando Vicente 6–3, 6–4 in the final.

Seeds

Draw

Finals

Top half

Bottom half

References

External links
 Main draw

1999 ATP Tour
Singles